Enoploides is a genus of nematodes belonging to the family Thoracostomopsidae.

The genus has almost cosmopolitan distribution.

Species:

Enoploides amphioxi 
Enoploides bisulcus 
Enoploides brattstroemi 
Enoploides brevis 
Enoploides brunettii 
Enoploides caspersi 
Enoploides cephalophorus 
Enoploides cirrhatus 
Enoploides delamarei 
Enoploides disparilis 
Enoploides fluviatilis 
Enoploides fluviatilus 
Enoploides gryphus 
Enoploides harpax 
Enoploides hirsutus 
Enoploides incurvatus 
Enoploides italicus 
Enoploides kerguelensis 
Enoploides koreanus 
Enoploides labiatus 
Enoploides labrostriatus 
Enoploides longicaudatus 
Enoploides longisetosus 
Enoploides longispiculosus 
Enoploides macrochaetus 
Enoploides mandibularis 
Enoploides oligochaetus 
Enoploides paralabiatus 
Enoploides polysetosus 
Enoploides ponticus 
Enoploides pterognathus 
Enoploides reductus 
Enoploides rimiformis 
Enoploides sabulicola 
Enoploides spiculohamatus 
Enoploides stewarti 
Enoploides suecicus 
Enoploides tridentatus 
Enoploides typicus 
Enoploides tyrannis 
Enoploides tyrrhenicus 
Enoploides uniformis 
Enoploides vectis

References

Nematodes